Oremus is a call to prayer.

Oremus may also refer to:
 Orémus (grape), former name of Zéta, a Hungarian wine grape used in the production of Tokaji
 Oremus (Tárrega), a prelude in D minor for classical guitar by composer Francisco Tárrega
 Mirko Oremuš (born 1988), Croatian professional footballer
 Stephen Oremus (born 1971), American musician
 Orémus Press Newspaper, monthly print newspaper for traditional Catholic families, founded November 2010 at Dover, Oklahoma, USA

See also
 Ormus, a 10th to 17th-century kingdom in the Persian Gulf